Michael Von Flatern (born October 19, 1954) is a Republican member of the Wyoming Senate, representing the 24th district  since 2005. The 24th district represents Campbell County, Wyoming.

Education
Michael Von Flatern received his education from the following institution:
Diploma, Saint Bernard's High School, 1972

Political Experience
Michael Von Flatern has had the following political experience:
Senator, Wyoming State Senate, 2005–present

Current Legislative Committees
Michael Von Flatern has been a member of the following committees:
Air Transportation Liaison Committee, Member
Appropriations, Member
Medicaid Cost Study - Oversight Legislative Advisory Committee, Chair
Select Committee on Legislative Facilities, Member

Caucuses/Non-Legislative Committees
Michael Von Flatern has been a member of the following committees:
Member, Community College Planning Task Force
Chair, Drug Court Steering Committee
Member, Energy Council
Member, State Office Building Exterior Design Oversight Committee
Member, Workforce Development Council

Professional Experience
Michael Von Flatern has had the following professional experience:
Owner/President, Von's Welding, Incorporated, 1979–1997
Owner/President, Innovative Mining and Equipment, Limited Liability Company
Pilot

References

1954 births
Living people
Politicians from New London, Connecticut
People from Gillette, Wyoming
Republican Party Wyoming state senators
21st-century American politicians